Quilemba is a town and commune of Angola, located in the province of Huíla. It is bisected by the province of Namibe.

See also 

 Communes of Angola

References 

Populated places in Huíla Province